The 2019–20 UConn Huskies men's basketball team represented the University of Connecticut in the 2019–20 NCAA Division I men's basketball season. The Huskies were led by second-year head coach Dan Hurley in their final season of the American Athletic Conference. The Huskies split their home games between the XL Center in Hartford, Connecticut, and the Harry A. Gampel Pavilion on the UConn campus in Storrs, Connecticut. They finished the season 19–12, 10–8 in AAC play to finish in a tie for fifth place. Their season ended when the AAC Tournament and all other postseason tournaments were canceled due to the COVID-19 pandemic.

This was the final season in the American Athletic Conference for the Huskies, as they returned to the Big East for the 2020–21 season.

Previous season
The Huskies finished the 2018–19 season 16–17, 6–12 in AAC play to finish in ninth place. They lost in the Quarterfinals of the AAC tournament to Houston.

Offseason

Departures

Incoming transfers

2019 recruiting class

Roster

Feb 28, 2020 - Sidney Wilson was suspended for the rest of the season for a violation of team policy.

Schedule and results

|-
!colspan=12 style=|Exhibition

|-
!colspan=12 style=|Non-conference regular season

|-
!colspan=12 style=|American Athletic Conference regular season

|-
!colspan=12 style=|AAC Tournament

Rankings

Awards and honors

American Athletic Conference honors

All-AAC First Team
Christian Vital

All-AAC Third Team
James Bouknight

All Freshman Team
James Bouknight

Player of the Week
Week 14: James Bouknight
Week 17: Christian Vital
Week 18: Christian Vital

Rookie of the Week
Week 3: James Bouknight
Week 15: James Bouknight

Source

References

UConn Huskies men's basketball seasons
Connecticut
Connecticut Huskies men's basketball
Connecticut Huskies men's basketball